Llankibatrachus is an extinct genus of prehistoric frogs in the family Pipidae. They are known from the Ypresian (Casamayoran) Huitrera Formation of Argentina.

Description 
The type species and the only known species, Llankibatrachus truebae, is named after Linda Trueb, a herpetologist from the University of Kansas. The species is known from two deposits near the Nahuel Huapi Lake in north-western Patagonia, Argentina. The finds include nearly complete specimens with impressions of skin, and individuals of different developmental stages, including tadpoles.

See also 

 Prehistoric amphibian
 List of prehistoric amphibians

References 

†
Paleogene amphibians
Eocene animals of South America
Casamayoran
Ypresian life
Eocene Argentina
Fossils of Argentina
Fossil taxa described in 2003
Paleogene Argentina